Spawning triggers are environmental cues that cause marine animals to breed. Most commonly they involve sudden changes in the environment, such as changes in temperature, salinity, and/or the abundance of food. Catfish of the genus Corydoras, for example, spawn immediately after heavy rain, the specific cues being an increase in water level and a decrease in temperature. When water levels rise, it allows many fish access to areas further upstream, that are better suited for reproduction, that was not previously accessible. This is a dangerous game that fish play, though. If they wait too long, they may get trapped in small pockets of water, and eventually, die when the levels recede.Discus will breed when the temperature goes up and there is an overabundance of much needed such as mosquito larvae. Many fish stock up on food to ensure they make it through this exhausting period of time that is very hard on their bodies, while others go without eating during the spawning process because they are so focused on their offspring.  

Spawning triggers is what allows many fish to synchronize their breeding, making it more probable that individual fish will find a mate. In most cases, if these triggers were not present, male and female fish would not be on the same page and the offspring would show for it. However, many fish do not respond to specific spawning triggers and will breed either constantly (e.g., guppies); at specific times of the year (e.g., grunion); or only at a certain point in their life cycle (e.g., eels). Some fish, like salmon, spend their whole life getting mature in the ocean, just to swim up many miles into various rivers to lay their eggs. This is such a grueling thing for their bodies, that some species die after laying their eggs. Although most commonly associated with fish, spawning triggers are also present in bivalves and corals.

In certain cases, aquarists can trigger spawning by duplicating the natural conditions where fish would breed. This can be done at times of the year that is not the same as typical breeding, indoors, fish can be artificially inseminated, etc. All of this is done by mimicking what conditions these fish go through, in the wild, to prepare and partake in the breeding/spawning process. As stated above, these conditions may include rainfall, water level, an abundance of food, and/or salinity of the water. Fish are truly incredible and will do anything to give the next generation of offspring the best chance of survival.

References

Ichthyology
Fishkeeping
Fish reproduction